Bank of Greene County is a federally-chartered savings bank headquartered in Catskill, NY with 17 branches located in the Upstate NY counties of Greene, Columbia, Albany, and Ulster.

The bank was initially founded on January 22, 1889, as the Building & Loan Association of Catskill.  Thomas E. Ferrier, Catskill Town Supervisor and owner of a brickyard and knitting mill, was elected as the Association's first President.   In 1911, the Building and Loan Association of Catskill changed its name to the Catskill Savings & Loan Association (CS&LA), and began accepting savings deposits.   In 1930, the CS&LA purchased its first building, located at 389 Main Street in Catskill, NY, for $15,000.   In 1940, total assets reached $1 million for the first time in the organization's history.   When the CS&LA outgrew 389 Main Street, it opened its first full-service office with a drive-up window in 1963, located at 425 Main Street in Catskill.   In 1974, the Catskill Savings & Loan Association converted to a state-chartered savings bank and changed its name to Greene County Savings Bank, opening its first dedicated branch in Coxsackie.

J. Bruce Whittaker became President of the Greene County Savings Bank in 1987, eventually becoming the longest tenured president in bank history.  In 1988, the bank opened a branch in Cairo, NY, and Greenville, NY in 1997.

History

In 1998, The Greene County Savings Bank changed its name to The Bank of Greene County and went public, establishing a holding company – Greene County Bancorp, Inc.  The bank also established a Charitable Foundation to support education, the arts, affordable housing, and other worthy causes.  In 2016, including that year's grants, the Bank of Greene County Charitable Foundation surpassed $1 million in grants awarded since inception in 1998.

In 1999, the bank's common stock was approved for listing on NASDAQ under the symbol GCBC.  The bank also purchased and renovated a historic art deco building at 302 Main Street, moving their administrative headquarters to the new building.  Built in 1931 as the Cooperative Insurance Building, it was designed by architect E. P. Valkenburgh of Middletown.   Over the next few years, new branches would be opened in Tannersville, Westerlo, Hudson, Catskill, Greenport, Chatham, Ravena, Germantown, Kingston, Copake, Woodstock, and Albany.  The existing Coxsackie and Cairo branches were also moved and expanded.

J. Bruce Whittaker retired on June 30, 2007, after 20 years as president and CEO.   He was succeeded by Donald Gibson, who started with the bank in 1987, and was promoted to senior vice president of commercial and retailing banking in 2003.

In 2014, The Bank celebrated its 125th Anniversary by ringing the NASDAQ opening bell in Times Square.

In late 2014, the Bank announced its first Ulster County Branch location in Kingston, NY, which opened in early 2015.  The Bank opened its second Ulster County location, in Woodstock, in the fall of 2018, and its third location in Albany County, on Wolf Road in the Town of Colonie, in 2020.

On February 17, 2016, Greene County Bancorp, Inc. (GCBC) declared a 2-for-1 stock split on outstanding common stock.   The stock split essentially gave shareholders of record 2 shares for every 1 share owned, and halved the stock price at the time of the split.

In June 2016, GCBC stock was included in the FTSE Russell 3000 for the first time. In 2022, the GCBC stock was included in the Russell 2000 Index for the first time. 

Due to continued growth, the Bank moved its Customer Service Center to a stand-alone building in the Fall of 2021.

On March 3, 2022, the Bank purchased the historic Tanners Building as a continuation of its investment in historic preservation.

Commitment to Historic Preservation

In addition to the renovated art deco administrative headquarters at 302 Main Street, the Bank also purchased and renovated 288 Main Street, which serves as the Operations Department and Customer Service Center.  The building was formerly a livery stable and car dealership.

In late 2013, The Bank of Greene County purchased the historic former Catskill Savings Bank building located at 341 Main Street in Catskill.   Built in 1909 by American architect Marcus T. Reynolds, the Bank kept the original marbled doorways, high, arched ceilings, and iconic central vault, while installing new fiber optics, servers, and the latest technology.   In 2014, the building was added to the Greene County Historical Register.

Response to COVID-19 
During the Coronavirus/COVID-19 Pandemic of 2020, the Bank of Greene County processed over 2,200 Paycheck Protection Program (PPP) applications for over $101 million and helped save over 13,000 local jobs.  For these efforts, the Bank was a 2021 recipient of the New York State Empire Award.

References

External links
 Official website
 Facebook Page
 Instagram Profile
 Investor Relations Website
 NASDAQ Company Profile
 Yahoo Finance Company Profile

Banks based in New York (state)
Economy of the Northeastern United States
Economy of New York (state)
Companies listed on the Nasdaq
Banks established in 1889
1889 establishments in New York (state)